Anolis rubribarbus, also known as the Sagua de Tánamo anole, is a species of lizard in the family Dactyloidae. The species is found in Cuba.

References

Anoles
Reptiles described in 1919
Endemic fauna of Cuba
Reptiles of Cuba